CHTZ-FM (97.7 MHz) is a commercial FM radio station in St. Catharines, Ontario, Canada, serving the Niagara Region. It is owned by Bell Media and it broadcasts an active rock format, branded as 97.7 HTZ-FM (pronounced "Hits FM"). CHTZ shares studios with its sister stations, CKTB and CHRE-FM, in "Oak Hill Mansion", the former home of William Hamilton Merritt, at 12 Yates Street in downtown St. Catharines.

CHTZ-FM has an effective radiated power (ERP) of 50,000 watts.  The transmitter is on Cataract Road in Thorold, sharing its tower with CHRE-FM.

History
The station launched on February 1, 1949 as an FM simulcast of the city's CKTB. The station later launched distinct programming, and adopted a country format with the new callsign CJQR-FM on April 30, 1979. Niagara District Broadcasting, the owner of CKTB and CJQR-FM, was acquired by Standard Broadcasting in 1980.

The station subsequently adopted its current callsign and a CHR format on June 27, 1986, which would later morph into its current rock format in 1989. In 1998, the station was sold to Affinity Radio Group. In 2000, Affinity was acquired by Telemedia, which was in turn acquired by Standard in 2002. Standard retained ownership of CHTZ after the reacquisition.

On October 26, 2007, Astral Media bought the station, as it acquired all of Standard's radio stations. The following year, along with sister station CFBR-FM in Edmonton, Alberta, Astral shifted the stations to active rock from mainstream rock. Astral's sister rockers CKQB-FM—Ottawa (which has since been sold to Corus and flipped to Top 40/CHR) and CJAY-FM—Calgary followed suit by 2010.

Astral Media merged with Bell Media on June 27, 2013, CHTZ-FM is now officially owned by Bell Media. The change also brought in more accountability with the affiliation to the Canadian Association of Broadcasters to ensure proper codes of conduct. Three years later on January 6, 2016, iHeartRadio announced that Bell Media would enter into a licensing deal to launch a Canadian version of its radio streaming service iHeartRadio. Bell Media will handle Canadian licensing, marketing, and distribution of the service, contribute its content to the venture, and also gain rights to produce iHeartRadio-branded events. The service launched in October 2016 and has significantly overhauled the old CHTZ-FM website with the iHeartRadio branding display.

On June 3, 2016 the station's early afternoon host Jesse Modz attracted national press attention when he pranked a scalper who was reselling tickets to The Tragically Hip's Man Machine Poem Tour. Modz talked the scalper into driving from Mississauga to St. Catharines by offering a $300 premium on top of the asking price; when the scalper arrived, Modz did not purchase the tickets, but rather confronted him about the ethics of scalping.

References

External links
97.7 HTZ-FM
CHTZ-FM history - Canadian Communications Foundation

Merritt House (CHTZ-FM studio) Paranormal Investigation by Haunted Hamilton

HTZ
HTZ
HTZ
Radio stations established in 1949
1986 establishments in Ontario